Malabar matthi curry, also known as fish curry, is an Indian also Goan dish. It consists of sardines semi-stewed in a Kerala-style curry with assorted vegetables, such as okra or onions. It is usually served with rice, naan, bread, or tapioca. The dish is most popular in Kerala, Goa, and Sri Lanka, where rice and fish are staple foods. Other variations may include adding tamarind juice or coconut milk.

History
The origins of the modern dish can be traced back to Tamil Nadu and Kerala.

Preparation

Fish curries are also eaten in Sri Lanka and other countries. The dish is also mass-produced, processed and packaged in cans and flexible pouches for consumer purchase.

See also
 Machha Jhola
 Fish head curry
 Cuisine of Kerala
 Indian cuisine
 Cuisine of Malaysia
 Cuisine of Singapore

References

Additional sources

Further reading
  (Cooking with fish and curry.)

External links

 www.newkerala.com: Sardine Curry Recipe
 pachakam.com: Matthi Curry Recipe with Coconut

Desi cuisine
Indian curries
Indian fish dishes
Kerala cuisine